Thymelicus hamza, the Moroccan small skipper, is a butterfly of the  family Hesperiidae. It is found in North Africa and from Anatolia to Turkestan.

The length of the forewings is 11–13 mm. Adults are on wing from May to June in one generation.

Subspecies
Thymelicus hamza hamza (Morocco, Algeria, Tunisia)
Thymelicus hamza novissima (Cyrenaica)

Pyrginae
Butterflies described in 1876
Butterflies of Africa
Butterflies of Asia
Taxa named by Charles Oberthür